Abul Kalam Rasheed Alam is an Indian politician. He was elected to the Assam Legislative Assembly from Goalpara East in the 2016 and 2021 Assam Legislative Assembly election as a member of the Indian National Congress.

References 

Living people
Indian National Congress politicians from Assam
Assam MLAs 2021–2026
People from Goalpara district
1972 births